This is a list of active lighthouses in Anguilla.

Lighthouses

See also
 Lists of lighthouses and lightvessels

References

External links

 

Anguilla
Lighthouses